Glutamicibacter arilaitensis is a bacterium from the genus of Glutamicibacter which has been isolated from Reblochon cheese from France.

References

Bacteria described in 2005
Micrococcaceae